Saint Isidore of Scetes (died ) was a 4th-century A.D. Egyptian Christian priest and desert ascetic. 

Isidore was one of the Desert Fathers and was a companion of Macarius the Great. 
John Cassian lists him as the leader of the one of the four monastic communities of Scetes.
The Roman Martyrology describes the blessed Isidore as renowned for holiness of life, faith and miracles.
His feast day is 15 January.

Monks of Ramsgate account

The monks of St Augustine's Abbey, Ramsgate, wrote in their Book of Saints (1921),

Butler's account

The hagiographer Alban Butler wrote in his Lives of the Fathers, Martyrs, and Other Principal Saints,

Notes

Sources

 

 

Saints from Roman Egypt
390 deaths
Desert Fathers